Sun Jihai (born 30 September 1977) is a Chinese former footballer who played in the English Premier League. He is one of the most well-known footballers in China. He was the first East Asian footballer to score in the Premier League when he scored a goal for Manchester City in October 2002, and also the first Chinese footballer to score in the UEFA Cup. Sun was a member of the Chinese national team that qualified for the 2002 FIFA World Cup, the country's only appearance at the World Cup.

Sun founded Beijing Haiqiu Technology Company (HQ Sports) in Feb of 2016, while he still played for Beijing Renhe in the China League One division. Subsequently, in December of the same year, Sun ended his 22 years of professional football career and announced his official retirement in a public event. Also at the same occasion, Sun announced the successful first round funding of his company, led by China Media Capital (CMC), Tencent and Yuan Xun Fund. HQ Sports has now developed to a staff force of more than 100 and with focus on Sports Technology, Media and Datatainment business in China and Worldwide.

Club career

Dalian Shide
Sun Jihai started his football career with Dalian Shide in 1995 and made his first appearance on 28 May 1995 against Sichuan Quanxing. Like many of the top young Chinese players of his generation, he wanted to go to the Chinese youth training camp in Brazil that was sponsored by Jianlibao. However, he was not selected as he was not deemed to possess enough potential. Sun showed great character by not letting this huge disappointment derail him and worked very hard to establish himself at his club. Sun enjoyed a successful spell with Dalian as the club won four league titles and one Chinese FA Cup title during his time there.

Crystal Palace
After three successful years at Dalian Shide, Sun along with Fan Zhiyi signed for Crystal Palace in August 1998. They became the first ever Chinese footballers to play in the English leagues. Sun made his debut for Crystal Palace in a 3–0 loss against Bury in the first leg of a 1998–99 Football League Cup match. He was recalled by Dalian who struggled heavily at the bottom of the league in the 1999 season.

Manchester City
In February 2002, Sun signed for English side Manchester City from Dalian Shide for £2 million and became the first Asian player to sign for the club. He made his debut for the club in a 4–2 win against Coventry City. His solid defence and dangerous attacking forays won over many City fans. He was voted the best player for the club in September 2002. In October 2002, Sun became the first East Asian footballer to score in the Premier League when he headed home the first goal in a 2–0 win over Birmingham City.

At the beginning of the 2004–05 season, Sun damaged his cruciate ligaments in a tackle with Chelsea striker Eiður Guðjohnsen and missed the rest of the season. After recuperating and following a strict physical regimen devised by his father, Sun re-installed his place as a regular in the club's starting lineup. In the 2006–07 season, Sun was set back yet again by another injury and he made his return on 10 February 2007, against Portsmouth which his side lost 2–1. With the arrival of Sven-Göran Eriksson as the new manager, Sun rarely played in the 2007–08 season. Sun played 14 games and only started 7 times in that season. He was replaced by Vedran Ćorluka at right back and Michael Ball played as the defensive substitute instead of Sun.

Sheffield United
On 2 July 2008, Sun signed a two-year deal with English Championship club Sheffield United. Sun only managed nineteen minutes in his first match for Sheffield United, getting sent off after picking up two yellows in a friendly. He went on to make his full debut in the opening fixture of the 2008–09 season against Birmingham City.
He was sent off during a game against Coventry City after a lunging tackle from behind on opposing player Michael Mifsud. The Football Association charged him for his behavior after receiving a red card even with his past good disciplinary record and handed him an additional one-match ban. Having played regularly until November he succumbed to an injury and subsequently failed to force his way back into the first team and made only a handful of appearances in the FA Cup in the second half of the season. Sun was then released from his contract in July 2009 with Sheffield United claiming he had "failed to settle" in Yorkshire.

Return to China
In July 2009, Sun was loaned to Sheffield United's satellite team Chengdu Blades in the Chinese Super League, hoping to make an impact. He steadily established himself at Chengdu and helped them to achieve the club's best ever league position at seventh place. However, the club was relegated to China League One in the fallout of a match fixing scandal. He returned to Sheffield United after the loan was finished, but his contract ended and was left without a club to play for.

On 8 January 2010, Sun signed a two-year contract with fellow top tier side Shaanxi Chanba. He was promoted as the team captain immediately and he extended his contract for another two years in December 2011. At the beginning of the 2012 season, Sun followed the club when it decided to move to Guizhou and rename themselves Guizhou Renhe. He played nineteen league matches and five Chinese FA Cup matches in the 2012 season as the club achieved fourth place that league season and were runners-up in the cup which gained them entry into AFC Champions League for the first time in the club's history.

On 4 February 2015, Sun moved to fellow top tier side Chongqing Lifan on a free transfer. He made his debut for the club on 8 March 2014 in a 3–0 loss against Beijing Guoan.

On 8 December 2015, Sun returned to second tier side Beijing Renhe on a free transfer.

On 10 December 2016, Sun announced his retirement from football.

International career
Sun made his international debut for the Chinese national team on 6 December 1996 against Uzbekistan. At the 2002 FIFA World Cup in a group stage match against Costa Rica, Sun picked up an ankle injury after a tackle from behind by Mauricio Solís after just 17 minutes. Unable to play, Sun was replaced after 25 minutes and sat out the rest of the group stage, while Solís was only shown a yellow card. On 7 June 2008, during a 2010 FIFA World Cup qualification match against Qatar, Sun was shown a straight red card for dissent while he was warming up as a substitute on the bench. China lost the match 1–0. He was given a ban of five matches by FIFA and did not receive any call-ups to the national team after this incident.

Career statistics

Club

International

International goals
Scores and results list China's goal tally first.

Honours

Club
Dalian Shide
 Chinese Jia-A League: 1996, 1997, 2000, 2001
 Chinese FA Cup: 2001
 Chinese FA Super Cup: 1997, 2000

Manchester City
 Football League First Division: 2001–02

Guizhou Renhe
 Chinese FA Cup: 2013
 Chinese FA Super Cup: 2014

Individual
 Chinese Football Association Young Player of the Year: 1998
 Chinese Jia-A League Team of the Year: 1997, 2001
 Chinese FA Super Cup Most Valuable Player: 2014
 English Football Hall of Fame Special Category: 2015
 IFFHS Legends

References

External links

1977 births
Living people
Chinese footballers
1996 AFC Asian Cup players
2002 FIFA World Cup players
2004 AFC Asian Cup players
2007 AFC Asian Cup players
China international footballers
Chinese expatriate footballers
Footballers from Dalian
Crystal Palace F.C. players
Dalian Shide F.C. players
Expatriate footballers in England
Association football fullbacks
Manchester City F.C. players
Premier League players
Sheffield United F.C. players
English Football League players
Chengdu Tiancheng F.C. players
Chongqing Liangjiang Athletic F.C. players
Beijing Renhe F.C. players
Chinese Super League players
China League One players
Asian Games medalists in football
Footballers at the 1998 Asian Games
Asian Games bronze medalists for China
Medalists at the 1998 Asian Games
Chinese expatriate sportspeople in England